Black Box is a 2002 Argentine  film, written and directed by Luis Ortega. The film stars Dolores Fonzi, Eugenia Bassi, and others.

Plot
The film tells of the relationships in a dysfunctional family.

Dorotea (Dolores Fonzi) is a young girl in her teens who works in a laundry and takes care of her grandmother (Eugenia Bassi) she lives with.

Her father, Eduardo (Eduardo Couget), is released from prison.

Eduardo is indigent and stricken with Parkinsons and lives in the Salvation Army shelter and panhandles from passing motorists as well.

Dorotea becomes Eduardo's caregiver.

Cast
 Dolores Fonzi as Dorotea
 Eugenia Bassi as Abuela
 Eduardo Couget as Padre
 Silvio Bassi as Silvio

Distribution
The film was first presented at the Buenos Aires International Festival of Independent Cinema on April 27, 2002 in Buenos Aires.  It opened wide in Argentina on August 15, 2002.

The film was screened at many film festivals, including: the Donostia-San Sebastián International Film Festival, Spain; the International Filmfest Mannheim-Heidelberg, Germany; the Philadelphia International Film Festival, United States; the Karlovy Vary Film Festival, Czech Republic; and others.

Awards

Wins
 Mannheim-Heidelberg International Filmfestival: Special Mention, Luis Ortega; 2002.
 Mar del Plata Film Festival: SIGNIS Award - Special Mention, Luis Ortega; Special Jury Award, Luis Ortega; 2002.
 Fribourg International Film Festival, Switzerland: Don Quixote Award; Luis Ortega; E-Changer Award, Luis Ortega; Special Jury Award, Luis Ortega; 2003.

Nominations
 Viña del Mar Film Festival, Chile: Grand Paoa, Luis Ortega; 2002.
 Argentine Film Critics Association Awards: Silver Condor; Best Actress, Dolores Fonzi; Best First Film, Luis Ortega; Best New Actor, Eduardo Couget; 2003.

References

External links
 
 Caja negra at the cinenacional.com 
 Caja negra film review at Fotograma.com by Pablo Silva 
  

2002 films
2002 drama films
Argentine black-and-white films
Argentine independent films
2000s Spanish-language films
2002 independent films
Argentine drama films
2000s Argentine films